Hateful Monday is a Swiss punk rock band from Geneva formed in 1998. The band currently consists of bassist and vocalist Reverend Seb, drummer Igor Gonzola and guitarist Jeanrem.

Over the years, Hateful Monday has become a pioneer of a new wave of punk-rock in the Lake Geneva region. Their primary influence is hardcore punk from the late 1980s to the early 1990s, such as Bad Religion, NOFX, No Fun At All and Propaghandi. Alkaline Trio and Hot Water Music have also shaped Hateful Mondays sound.
Hateful Monday regularly tour throughout Europe and frequently in neighbouring France. In April 2015 the band played six shows in Japan, which marked their first tour outside of Europe.

History

Formation and early years (1998–2004)
Hateful Monday was formed in the suburbs of Geneva, Switzerland, by two school friends, Reverend Seb and Igor Gonzola. Both were heavily influenced by the new wave of punk rock that was arriving from abroad, and the duo made their debuts with various different lineups. 
Together with their friends Myriam K.and Mark Sman, they recorded their first demo “Do You Have The Same But In Pants?” in 2000 and “Don’t Ask Questions” in 2001. These initial demos allowed Hateful Monday to play their first shows and to begin building their reputation.
Mark Sman’s departure from the band in 2001 shifted the lineup. Reverend Seb switched to bass guitar while continuing with lead vocals, and Greg Laraigne joined the group the same year on second guitar.

Further success (2004–2010)
In 2004, Myriam K. left the band and was replaced by M. Fallan as guitarist. The band released the album “Take a Breath” the same year, and commenced their first European tour. Their popularity amplified with their 2006 album “Last March of the Ignorants” which was successful in Europe and Japan. The band performed at Paleo Festival in 2006, in front of their largest audience yet. In 2008 the band's next album “Half A World Away” was released, receiving good reviews.

Line-up changes and fourth album (2010–2014)
In 2010, the band deliberately modified their sound and recorded a  more hardcore EP called “Lions and Jackals”. Following up on this release and previous successes, a Japan tour was scheduled for April 2011. Due to the earthquake in March 2011, this was cancelled indefinitely.

In 2011, Charly Cougar of Swiss chaoscore band Elizabeth, was added to the lineup, bringing the band to a quintet. M. Fallan switched to bass, with Reverend Seb concentrating his efforts on vocals. This quintet toured numerous times throughout Europe and Switzerland, until 2012 when Greg Laraigne left in order to pursue his career as a tattoo artist in Canada. Once again a quartet, the band recorded and released “It Must Be Somewhere” in early 2014, followed by a European tour

Return to a trio and the future (2014-)
Soon after the release of It Must Be Somewhere, M. Fallan announced his decision to leave the band to concentrate on other projects. Reverend Seb returned to bass guitar and vocals, and the band played multiple shows in France and Switzerland.

In early 2015, the band announced six tour dates in Japan.

In 2017, Jean Rem replaced Charly on guitar. A few months later the band released the album Unfrightened.

In 2018, they released a compilation album, Still Unknown After All These Years to celebrate the 20th anniversary of the band.

In 2019, the EP Pit Stop Punk Rock was released.

On August 14, 2019 Hateful Monday opened for NOFX at L'Usine in Geneva. This opening set was recorded and released as live album titled Mermaiding Over Geneva in June 2020.

Band members

Current members
 Reverend Seb – lead vocals (1998–present); bass guitar (2001-2011; 2014–present); guitar (1998-2001)
 Jean Rem – guitar, backing vocals (2016–present)
 Igor Gonzola – drums (1998–present)

Former members
 Mark Sman – bass guitar  (1999-2001)
 Myriam K. – guitar, backing vocals  (2000-2004)
 Greg Laraigne – guitar, backing vocals  (2001-2012)
 M. Fallan – guitar, backing vocals  (2004-2011); bass guitar, backing vocals  (2011-2014)
 Charly Cougar – guitar, backing vocals  (2011-2016)

Timeline

Discography

Studio albums
Take a Breath (2004)
The Last March of the Ignorants (2006)
Half a World Away (2008)
It Must Be Somewhere (2014)
Unfrightened (2017)

Live albums
Mermaiding Over Geneva (Live At Usine 2019) (2020)

Compilation albums
Still Unknown After All These Years (2018)

EP's
Do You Have The Same But In Pants? (2000) (demo)
Don't Ask Questions (2001)
Lions and Jackals (2010)
Pit Stop Punk Rock (2019)

Trivia
The band is not overly worried about music piracy. The liner notes of The Last March of the Ignorants includes the following text:

References

External links 

 
 

Swiss punk rock groups